PSQL can refer to:

 Pervasive PSQL, a proprietary DBMS optimized for embedding in applications
 psql (PostgreSQL), an interactive terminal-based front-end to PostgreSQL
 Procedural SQL, procedural programming extensions to Structured Query Language (SQL)